Daniel Stodhart Campbell (1812 – 28 April 1875) was a merchant and politician in colonial Victoria, a member of the Victorian Legislative Assembly.

Campbell was born in Camberwell, London, England, the son of a clergyman.
Campbell emigrated to Sydney in 1838 and soon overlanded to the Port Phillip District (later to become the colony of Victoria) in January 1839 and worked as a merchant. 
In November 1856, Campbell was elected to the Victorian Legislative Assembly for Richmond, a position he held until August 1859.

Campbell died at his residence Vaucluse, Richmond, Victoria, on 28 April 1875.

References

 

1812 births
1875 deaths
Members of the Victorian Legislative Assembly
People from Camberwell
English emigrants to colonial Australia
19th-century Australian politicians